William Theodore Link (December 15, 1933 – December 27, 2020) was an American film and television screenwriter and producer who often worked in collaboration with Richard Levinson.

Biography

Early life 
Born in Philadelphia, Pennsylvania, William Link was the son of Elsie (née Roerecke) and William Theodore Link, a textile broker. His mother had German Huguenot heritage. Link discovered late in life that his father's parents were Jewish. Link's niece, Amy, examined a suitcase William Theodore had left to his son, which they had kept in their attic. She opened it in 2011 and it turned out to contain genealogical research and evidence done by William Theodore during World War II. Amy had discovered that Link's paternal grandparents were Jewish. Link earned a degree from the University of Pennsylvania's Wharton School of Business prior to serving in the United States Army from 1956 to 1958.

Levinson partnership 

William Link and Richard Levinson met on their first day of junior high school. Each had enjoyed doing magic tricks and other students repeatedly mentioned to each of them that they should meet. They began writing together soon after. In high school, they created radio scripts. While studying at the University of Pennsylvania, they wrote film criticism for the college newspapers. Some of their short stories were published in Playboy.

They sold their first short story, "Whistle While You Work", to Ellery Queen Mystery Magazine, which published it in the November 1954 issue. In 1959, their play Chain of Command was produced by the Westinghouse Desilu Playhouse. This was followed by script-writing for Alfred Hitchcock Presents (Day of Reckoning, original air date November 22, 1962, based on a novel by John Garde), Dr. Kildare, and The Fugitive. In 1965,  they wrote three episodes of Honey West (TV series) including the final episode. They co-created and sometimes produced such TV series as Mannix in 1968, Columbo in 1969, Ellery Queen, and Murder, She Wrote (co-created with Peter S. Fischer). The character of Columbo was first introduced by Link and Levinson in a 1960 episode of The Chevy Mystery Show. For the Jessica Fletcher character they created in 1983 when CBS contacted them to create a new mystery TV show, they found inspiration in a mix of Agatha Christie and her Miss Marple character. At first, they wanted Jean Stapleton for the role, but she ended up declining the offer.

They collaborated on several made-for-TV movies, including The Gun, My Sweet Charlie, That Certain Summer, The Judge and Jake Wyler, Guilty Conscience, The Execution of Private Slovik, Charlie Cobb: A Nice Night for a Hanging, and Blacke's Magic; the last, which starred Hal Linden and Harry Morgan, was also developed into a short-lived TV series. The partners collaborated, as well, on two feature films: The Hindenburg (1975) and Rollercoaster (1977). Levinson and Link occasionally used the pseudonym "Ted Leighton", most notably on the telefilm Ellery Queen: Don't Look Behind You (1971), where their work was substantially rewritten by other hands, and on Columbo when they came up with stories to be scripted by their collaborators.

They co-wrote the Broadway musical magic show Merlin starring Doug Henning and co-scripted the film The Execution of Private Slovik.

Post 1990s 

Following the sudden death of Levinson in 1987, Link continued his writing and producing career in many media. In 1991, in tribute to Levinson, he wrote the script for the 1991 TV film The Boys, starring James Woods and John Lithgow. He was a frequent contributor to such mystery fiction publications as Ellery Queen's Mystery Magazine and Alfred Hitchcock's Mystery Magazine. His post-Levinson TV work includes The Cosby Mysteries (1994–95), starring Bill Cosby. Link also was executive story consultant on the short-lived science fiction/detective series Probe in 1988.

In 2010, the specialist mystery publishing house, Crippen & Landru, released The Columbo Collection, a book featuring a dozen original short stories about Lieutenant Columbo, all written by Link. In 2021, a further collection of stories, Shooting Script, was edited for C&L by Joseph Goodrich.

Link died from heart failure in Los Angeles on December 27, 2020, at age 87.

Publications

Awards 

All the following awards were jointly won by Link and Levinson :
 1970: Emmy Award for My Sweet Charlie.
 1979: Special Edgar Award from the Mystery Writers of America for Ellery Queen and Columbo.
 1980s: Three-time winners of the Edgar Award for Best TV Feature or MiniSeries Teleplay.
 1989: WA's Ellery Queen Award for outstanding mystery-writing teams.
 1995: Elected to the Television Academy Hall of Fame.

Other recognitions:
 2002: Named president of the Mystery Writers of America (one of the few television writers to achieve this honor.

Eponyms 

The William Link Theatre on the campus of California State University, Long Beach, is named after Link in honor of his work and donation of plays.

References

External links 
 
 

1933 births
2020 deaths
20th-century American male writers
21st-century American male writers
American crime fiction writers
American film producers
American male novelists
American male screenwriters
American male television writers
American people of German descent
American people of Jewish descent
American television writers
Columbo
Edgar Award winners
Novelists from Pennsylvania
People from Cheltenham, Pennsylvania
Wharton School of the University of Pennsylvania alumni
Writers from Philadelphia
20th-century American screenwriters